Duke Zhao of Qi (died 613 BC) was from 632 to 613 BC ruler of the State of Qi, a major power during the Spring and Autumn period of ancient China.  His personal name was Lü Pan (呂潘), ancestral name Jiang (姜), and Duke Zhao was his posthumous title.  He was known as Prince Pan before his accession to the throne.

Accession to the throne

Duke Zhao's father was Duke Huan of Qi, who was the first of the Five Hegemons, the most powerful rulers of the Spring and Autumn period.  Duke Huan had at least three main wives who bore no sons, six favoured concubines, and more than ten sons.  Duke Zhao was then known as Prince Pan, and his mother was Ge Ying, a princess of the minor state of Ge (葛).  Five other sons of Duke Huan also contended for the throne: Prince Wukui, Crown Prince Zhao (later Duke Xiao), Prince Shangren (later Duke Yi), Prince Yuan (later Duke Hui), and Prince Yong.

When Duke Huan died in the tenth month of 643 BC, the six princes  fought one another for the throne. Wukui prevailed at first, but he sat on the throne for only three months before being killed by supporters of Crown Prince Zhao.  Prince Zhao ascended the throne with the help of Duke Xiang of Song and was known as Duke Xiao of Qi.

Duke Xiao reigned for ten years.  After he died in 633 BC, Prince Kaifang of Wey, who had been a trusted official of Duke Huan, killed Duke Xiao's son and helped Prince Pan usurp the throne.  Prince Pan is posthumously known as Duke Zhao of Qi.

Reign and succession
In 632 BC, Duke Wen of Jin defeated the State of Chu at the Battle of Chengpu, and was declared the Hegemon of China, a title that was previously held by Duke Zhao's father Duke Huan.

In 627 BC, the sixth year of Duke Zhao's reign, the Di tribes invaded Qi.

In the fifth month of 613 BC, Duke Zhao died and was succeeded by his son She.  However, just two months later She was murdered by Duke Zhao's younger brother Shangren, who usurped the throne and was posthumously known as Duke Yì of Qi.

Family
Wives:
 Zi Shu Ji, of the Ji clan, the mother of Prince She

Sons:
 Prince She (d. 613 BC), ruled as the Duke of Qi in 613 BC

Ancestry

References

Year of birth unknown
Monarchs of Qi (state)
7th-century BC Chinese monarchs
613 BC deaths